Sangpo Bumtri is the creator god of Bon. He has "neither eyes to see, nor hands to hold, nor ears to hear, or nose to smell, he has only his spirit".

References 

Bon deities